The following is a list of winning streaks in the Olympic Games.

Diving

Men's

10m Platform
3 consecutive gold medals at Olympic Games – Klaus Dibiasi
 Streak started 1968 Mexico City, Mexico
 Streak ended 1980 Moscow, Soviet Union

7 consecutive gold medals at Olympic Games – United States
 Streak started 1920 Antwerp, Belgium
 Streak ended 1956 Melbourne, Australia

3m Springboard
11 consecutive gold medals at Olympic Games – United States
 Streak started 1920 Antwerp, Belgium
 Streak ended 1972 Munich, West Germany

Synchronized 10m Platform
5 consecutive gold medals at Olympic Games – China
 Streak started 2004 Athens, Greece

4x100-meter medley relay, swimming
10 consecutive Gold medals, Men, United States
 Streak started in 1960 in Rome, Italy. (Might been 16 consecutive golds if Team US did not boycott Moscow 1980 and not compete; otherwise first 5 consecutive (Rome 1960 to Montreal 1976) and then 10 consecutive (Los Angeles 1984 to Tokyo 2020).

Women's

10m Platform
7 consecutive gold medals at Olympic Games – United States
 Streak started 1924 Paris, France
 Streak ended 1960 Rome, Italy

3m Springboard
9 consecutive gold medals at Olympic Games – China
 Streak started 1988 Seoul, South Korea

3m Springboard
8 consecutive gold medals at Olympic Games – United States
 Streak started 1920 Antwerp, Belgium
 Streak ended 1960 Rome, Italy

Synchronized 10m Platform
6 consecutive gold medals at Olympic Games – China
 Streak started 2000 Sydney, Australia

Synchronized 3m Springboard
5 consecutive gold medals at Olympic Games – China
 Streak started 2004 Athens, Greece

Swimming

Johnny Weissmuller never lost a swimming race during his entire amateur career, including three individual Olympic gold medals. He is purported to have told the other swimmers in his Olympic final that they could fight it out for second place.

Michael Phelps was similarly undefeated in the finals of the 200m butterfly for ten years. Before the 2012 Olympics where he was defeated by Chad le Clos. The last time Phelps had lost the race was in 2002 when he lost to Olympic champion Tom Malchow at the 2002 Pan Pacific Swimming Championships.

Men's

100m Freestyle
5 consecutive gold medals at Olympic Games – United States
 Streak started 1908 London, United Kingdom
 Streak ended 1932 Los Angeles, United States

400m Freestyle
3 consecutive gold medals at Olympic Games – United States
 Streak started 1932 Los Angeles, United States
 Streak ended 1952 Helsinki, Finland

1500m Freestyle
4 consecutive gold medals at Olympic Games – Australia
 Streak started 1992 Barcelona, Spain
 Streak ended 2008 Beijing, China

100m Backstroke
6 consecutive gold medals at Olympic Games – United States
 Streak started 1996 Atlanta, United States

200m Backstroke
6 consecutive gold medals at Olympic Games – United States
 Streak started 1996 Atlanta, United States
 Streak ended 2021 Tokyo, Japan

200m Breaststroke
3 consecutive gold medals at Olympic Games – Japan
 Streak started 1928 Amsterdam, Netherlands
 Streak ended 1948 London, United Kingdom

100m Butterfly
3 consecutive gold medals at Olympic Games – Michael Phelps
 Streak started 2004 Athens, Greece
 Streak started 2016 Rio de Janeiro, Brazil

3 consecutive gold medals at Olympic Games
 United States
 Streak started 1968 Mexico City, Mexico
 Streak ended 1980 Moscow, Soviet Union
 United States
 Streak started 2004 Athens, Greece
 Streak started 2016 Rio de Janeiro, Brazil

200m Butterfly
3 consecutive gold medals at Olympic Games
 United States
 Streak started 1968 Mexico City, Mexico
 Streak ended 1980 Moscow, Soviet Union
 United States
 Streak started 2000 Sydney, Australia
 Streak ended 2012 London, United Kingdom

200m Individual Medley
4 consecutive gold medals at Olympic Games – Michael Phelps
 Streak started 2004 Athens, Greece
 Streak started 2016 Rio de Janeiro, Brazil

3 consecutive gold medals at Olympic Games
 Hungary
 Streak started 1988 Seoul, South Korea
 Streak ended 2000 Sydney, Australia
 United States
 Streak started 2004 Athens, Greece

400m Individual Medley
5 consecutive gold medals at Olympic Games – United States
 Streak started 1996 Atlanta, United States
 Streak ended 2016 Rio de Janeiro, Brasil

4 × 100 m Freestyle Relay
7 consecutive titles at Olympic Games – United States
 Streak started 1964 Tokyo, Japan (Inaugural Competition)
 Streak ended 2000 Sydney, Australia

4 × 200 m Freestyle Relay
7 consecutive titles at Olympic Games – United States
 Streak started 1960 Rome, Italy
 Streak ended 1992 Barcelona, Spain
Note: excluding boycotted Moscow Olympics

4 × 100 m Medley Relay
14 consecutive titles at Olympic Games – United States
 Streak started 1960 Rome, Italy (Inaugural Competition)
Note: excluding boycotted Moscow Olympics

Women's

100m Freestyle
3 consecutive titles at Olympic Games – Dawn Fraser
 Streak started 1956 Melbourne, Australia
 Streak ended 1968 Mexico City, Mexico

4 consecutive titles at Olympic Games – United States
 Streak started 1920 Antwerp, Belgium
 Streak ended 1936 Berlin, Germany

400m Freestyle
3 consecutive titles at Olympic Games
 United States
 Streak started 1924 Paris, France
 Streak ended 1936 Berlin, Germany
 United States
 Streak started 1960 Rome, Italy
 Streak ended 1972 Munich, West Germany

800m Freestyle
5 consecutive titles at Olympic Games – United States
 Streak started 1984 Los Angeles, United States
 Streak ended 2004 Athens, Greece

100m Backstroke
4 consecutive titles at Olympic Games – United States
 Streak started 1960 Rome, Italy
 Streak ended 1976 Montreal, Canada

200m Backstroke
3 consecutive titles at Olympic Games – Krisztina Egerszegi
 Streak started 1988 Seoul, South Korea
 Streak ended 2000 Sydney, Australia

3 consecutive titles at Olympic Games – Hungary
 Streak started 1988 Seoul, South Korea
 Streak ended 2000 Sydney, Australia

200m Breaststroke
3 consecutive titles at Olympic Games – United States
 Streak started 2004 Athens, Greece

100m Butterfly
3 consecutive titles at Olympic Games – United States
 Streak started 1956 Melbourne, Australia (Inaugural Competition)
 Streak ended 1968 Mexico City, Mexico

4 × 100 m Freestyle Relay
6 consecutive titles at Olympic Games – United States
 Streak started 1960 Rome, Italy
 Streak ended 1988 Seoul, South Korea
Note: excluding boycotted Moscow Olympics

4 × 200 m Freestyle Relay
3 consecutive titles at Olympic Games – United States
 Streak started 1996 Atlanta, United States (Inaugural Competition)
 Streak ended 2008 Beijing, China

4 × 100 m Medley Relay
4 consecutive titles at Olympic Games – United States
 Streak started 1960 Rome, Italy (Inaugural Competition)
 Streak ended 1976 Montreal Canada

Synchronized swimming

Duet
4 consecutive gold medals at Olympics – Russia
 Streak started 2000 Sydney, Australia

Team
4 consecutive gold medals at Olympics – Russia
 Streak started 2000 Sydney, Australia

Archery

Men's

Team
3 consecutive gold medals at Olympic games – South Korea
 Streak started 2000 Sydney, Australia
 Streak ended 2012 London, England

Women's

Individual
6 consecutive gold medals at Olympic games – South Korea
 Streak started 1984 Los Angeles, United States
 Streak ended 2008 Beijing, China

Team
9 consecutive gold medals at Olympic games – South Korea
 Streak started 1988 Seoul, South Korea (Inaugural Team Competition)

Athletics
The longest nation streak and the longest athlete streak are listed if they are at least three.

Men's

Women's

Basketball
64 games  –  1936–1972 United States
 Streak started August 7, 1936 (defeated Spain, forfeit)
 Streak ended September 9, 1972 (defeated by Soviet Union, 51-50)

7 Consecutive Men's titles at Olympic Games – United States
 Streak started 1936 Berlin, Germany
 Streak ended 1972 Munich, West Germany

7 Consecutive Women's titles at Olympic Games – United States
 Streak started 1996 Atlanta, United States

Boxing
3 consecutive Olympic gold medals
 László Papp
 Streak started 1948 London, United Kingdom
 Streak ended 1960 Rome, Italy
 Teófilo Stevenson
 Streak started 1972 Montreal, Canada
 Streak ended 1984 Los Angeles, United States (boycotted by Cuba and also exceeded AIBA's age limit)
 Félix Savón
 Streak started 1992 Barcelona, Spain
 Streak ended 2004, Athens, Greece

7 consecutive Olympic heavyweight titles – Cuba
 Streak started 1972 Munich, West Germany
 Streak ended 2008 Beijing, China

Note: excluding boycotted Los Angeles and Seoul Olympics

Figure skating
3 consecutive Olympic gold medals
 Sonja Henie
 Streak started 1928 St. Moritz, Switzerland
 Streak ended 1948 St. Moritz, Switzerland
 Irina Rodnina
 Streak started 1972 Sapporo, Japan
 Streak ended 1984 Sarajevo, Yugoslavia
 Gillis Grafström
 Streak started 1920 Antwerp, Belgium
 Streak ended 1932 Lake Placid, USA

Field hockey

Men's
6 consecutive gold medals
 India
 Streak started 1928 Amsterdam, Netherlands
 Streak ended 1956 Melbourne, Australia

Ice hockey

Men's
4 consecutive gold medals
 Canada
 Streak started 1920 Antwerp, Belgium
 Streak ended 1936 Garmisch-Partenkirchen, Germany
 Soviet Union
 Streak started 1964 Innsbruck, Austria
 Streak ended 1980 Lake Placid, United States

Women's
4 consecutive gold medals – Canada
 Streak started 2002 Salt Lake City, United States
 Most recent win 2014 Sochi, Russia

Weightlifting
3 consecutive Olympic gold medals
 Naim Süleymanoğlu
 Streak started 1988 Seoul, South Korea
 Streak ended 2000 Sydney, Australia
 Pyrros Dimas
 Streak started 1992 Barcelona, Spain
 Streak ended 2004 Athens, Greece
 Kakhi Kakhiashvili
 Streak started 1992 Barcelona, Spain
 Streak ended 2004 Athens, Greece
 Halil Mutlu
 Streak started 1996 Atlanta, United States
 Streak ended 2008 Beijing, China

7 consecutive heavyweight Olympic titles – Soviet Union
 Streak started 1960 Rome, Italy
 Streak ended 1992 Barcelona, Spain
Note: excluding boycotted Los Angeles Olympics

6 consecutive super heavyweight Olympic titles – Soviet Union
 Streak started 1972 Munich, West Germany (Inaugural Competition)
 Streak ended 2000 Sydney, Australia
Note: excluding boycotted Los Angeles Olympics

Rowing

Men's Coxless Pair
3 consecutive gold medals at Olympic Games – Steve Redgrave
 Streak started 1988 Seoul, South Korea
 Streak ended 2000 Sydney, Australia

Note: gold medalist in Coxed Four at Los Angeles Olympics (1984) and in Coxless Four at Sydney Olympics.

Men's Eights
8 consecutive titles at Olympic Games – United States
 Streak started 1920 Antwerp, Belgium
 Streak ended 1960 Rome, Italy

Wrestling

Men's Greco-Roman
4 consecutive Olympics titles
 Mijaín López
 Streak started 2008 Beijing, China

Men's Freestyle
3 consecutive Olympics titles (tie)
 Aleksandr Medved
 Streak started 1964 Tokyo, Japan
 Streak ended 1972 Munich, West Germany
 Artur Taymazov
 Streak started 2004 Athens, Greece

187 consecutive matches including 1964 Tokyo Olympics – Osamu Watanabe

Note:  The only modern Olympian to go unbeaten throughout his entire career.

6 consecutive Men's heavyweight Olympic titles – USSR
 Streak started 1964 Tokyo, Japan
 Streak ended 1992 Barcelona, Spain
Note: excluding boycotted Los Angeles Olympics

Men's Greco-Roman
13 years including 3 consecutive Olympics titles (1988–1996) – Alexander Karelin
 Streak started 1988
 Streak ended 2000 Sydney, Australia
6 years without a single point scored upon – Alexander Karelin
 Streak started 1994
 Streak ended 2000 Sydney, Australia

6 consecutive Men's heavyweight Olympic titles – USSR/Unified Team/Russia
 Streak started 1972 Munich, West Germany
 Streak ended 2000 Sydney, Australia
Note: excluding boycotted Los Angeles Olympics

Women's Freestyle
4 consecutive Olympics titles – Kaori Icho
 Streak started 2004 Athens, Greece

References

winning streaks